Kalyanji Anandji is a 1995 Indian Malayalam Comedy film, directed by Balu Kiriyath, starring Mukesh,  Harisree Ashokan and Annie in the lead roles. The film was commercially successful and remade in Tamil as Kavalai Padathe Sagodhara with Pandiarajan.

Premise
Kalyanakrishnan, who hails from a Brahmin family, marries his girlfriend Mary Nirmala who is a Christian. Their life takes a turn when their parents learn about their relationship.

Cast

 Mukesh as Kalyanakrishnan
 Harishree Ashokan as Anantharaman, Kalyanakrishnan's brother
 Annie as Mary Nirmala / Shivagami
 Sukumari as Kalyanakrishnan's mother
 Cochin Haneefa as Vengalam Chakkunni / Adv. General Oorumadam Subbarama Iyer
 Indrans as Maniyan
 Mamukkoya as Balusherry Basheer/Swami Danthagopurananda Mouni Baba
 Paravoor Bharathan as Shambho Mahadevan, Kalyanakrishnan's brother	
 Jose Pallissery as Lakshminarayanan, Kalyanakrishnan's brother
 Narendra Prasad as Dr. Shankaran, Kalyanakrishnan's brother
 V. K. Sreeraman as Girijavallabhan, Kalyanakrishnan's brother
 Shivaji as Seetharaman, Kalyanakrishnan's brother	
 P. C. George as Mathachan, Nirmala's father
 Anila Sreekumar as Bhagyalakshmi
 Kanakalatha as Lakshminarayanan's wife
 Priyanka Anoop as Seetharaman's wife
 Ragini (New) as Kanakam, Girijavallabhan's wife
 Philomina as Chettathi	
 Tony as Gopalakrishnan (Kalyanakrishnan's Friend)
 Shabnam

References

External links

1995 films
1990s Malayalam-language films
Indian comedy films
Malayalam films remade in other languages